Mercedes-Benz has sold a number of automobiles with the "500" model name, and the nomenclature usually refers the 5.0L V8 engine under the hood.

Most of the "500" badged cars featuring this type of engine are the various incarnations of the Mercedes-Benz S-Class flagship sedan, making it synonymous with the "500" vernacular. However, the engine and model number can also be found on other nameplates such as the E-Class midsize sedan, CL-Class coupé, and SL-Class roadster.

Examples
 Mercedes-Benz W08 - Nürburg 500, 500
 Mercedes-Benz R107 - 500SL
 Mercedes-Benz R129 - 500SL, SL500
 Mercedes-Benz W124 - 500E, E500
 Mercedes-Benz W126 - 500SEC, 500SEL
 Mercedes-Benz W140 - 500SEL, 500 SEC, S500
 Mercedes-Benz W220 - S500
 Mercedes-Benz W221 - S500 (S550 in North America)

500